The 1972 Trans-American Championship was the seventh running of the Sports Car Club of America's Trans-Am Series. The first seven rounds used split classes, while the last four classes had the Under 2500cc class only. Milt Minter brought Pontiac its first win, at Mid-Ohio. George Follmer and American Motors won the over 2.5L division, while John Morton led Datsun to the championship title of the "Two-Five Challenge".

1972 is considered to be the end of the series' "golden era". From 1973 onward, Trans Am would evolve into a lesser clone of the rival IMSA GT Championship, with similarly modified cars, but with a more conventional focus with vehicles such as the Chevrolet Beretta being used. IMSA GT's focus on exotic cars such as Ferraris and Porsches provided a more adaptable format, in comparison to Trans Am's reliance on domestic performance sedans.

Schedule

Championships

Drivers' championships
The points system was as follows:

Over 2.5L

Under 2.5L

Manufacturers' championships 
Only the highest-finishing car scored points for the manufacturer. The points system was as follows:

Over 2.5L
Best 6 results count toward the championship.

Under 2.5L
Best 9 results count towards the championship.

See also
1972 Can-Am season

References

Trans-Am Series
Transam
Transam